Merab Turkadze is a Georgian boxer. At the 2012 Summer Olympics, he competed in the Men's bantamweight, but was defeated in the first round.

References

Male boxers from Georgia (country)
Year of birth missing (living people)
Living people
Olympic boxers of Georgia (country)
Boxers at the 2012 Summer Olympics
Bantamweight boxers
People from Kutaisi
21st-century people from Georgia (country)